This article lists all the men who have won senior golf's major championships. The tallies do not include wins in the Senior PGA Championship and the Senior British Open before they became senior majors. The five majors are shown in the order in which they are currently played each year. There is a complete list of results in the senior majors article. The list is up to date through the 2022 U.S. Senior Open.

1 senior major: Jim Albus, Steven Alker, Michael Allen, Don Bies, Olin Browne, Brad Bryant, Darren Clarke, Russ Cochran, Jim Colbert, Neil Coles, Joe Daley, Marco Dawson, Roberto De Vicenzo, Dale Douglass, Dave Eichelberger, Bruce Fleisher, John Fourie, David Frost, Jim Furyk, Larry Gilbert, Stewart Ginn, Retief Goosen, Pádraig Harrington, Simon Hobday, Brian Huggett, Kōki Idoki, John Jacobs, Mark James, Don January, Jerry Kelly, Tom Kite, Larry Laoretti, Bruce Lietzke, Scott McCarron, Mark McNulty, Rocco Mediate, Larry Mowry, Pete Oakley, Mark O'Meara, Don Pooley, Gene Sauers, Tom Shaw, Vijay Singh, J. C. Snead, Ian Stanley, Noboru Sugai, Ken Tanigawa, Peter Thomson, Jim Thorpe, David Toms, Bruce Vaughan, Bobby Verwey, Bobby Wadkins, Tom Wargo, Denis Watson, D. A. Weibring, Tom Weiskopf, Mark Wiebe, Fuzzy Zoeller

References

 
Champions Tour major championship wins
Champions Tour major championship wins